Daniel Salvador Reyes Avellán (born July 21, 1990) is a Nicaraguan footballer who currently plays as a striker for Walter Ferretti in the Primera División de Nicaragua.

Club career
He previously played for Brazilian club Tigres do Brasil and joined Peruvian club Sport Boys in January 2012 only to be discarded after playing in a friendly match later that month. After a return to Nicaragua and a spell at hometown club Diriangén, he was snapped up by Walter Ferreti in June 2013.

International career
Reyes made his debut for Nicaragua in a September 2011 FIFA World Cup qualification match against Dominica and has, as of July 2017, earned a total of 14 caps, scoring 1 goal. He has represented his country in 3 FIFA World Cup qualification matches and played at the 2013 Copa Centroamericana. He was a non-playing squad member at the 2009 CONCACAF Gold Cup.

International goals
Scores and results list Nicaragua's goal tally first.

References

External links

1990 births
Living people
People from Carazo Department
Association football forwards
Nicaraguan men's footballers
Nicaragua international footballers
2009 CONCACAF Gold Cup players
2013 Copa Centroamericana players
Diriangén FC players
Sport Boys footballers
C.D. Walter Ferretti players
Nicaraguan expatriate footballers
Expatriate footballers in Brazil
Expatriate footballers in Peru